Hans Seeberg (November 18, 1904 – October 17, 1984) was a Norwegian marketing agent.

Seeberg spent much of his career as CEO of the advertising agency Thau Reklamebyrå. After stepping down in 1958, co-founded the Institute of Marketing. It was modeled on the English Institute of Practitioners in Advertising, and owned by the Association of Advertising Agencies. The Institute was incorporated into the Norwegian School of Marketing in 1989, which was in turn affiliated with the BI Norwegian Business School.

References

1904 births

1984 deaths